"Turn-Down Day" is a song written by Jerry Keller and David Blume and performed by The Cyrkle.  The song was produced by John Simon, and was featured on their 1966 album, Red Rubber Ball.
It reached #16 on both the Billboard Hot 100 and the Canadian pop chart, and also reached #18 on the U.S. Cashbox chart in 1966.

Background
According to Candy Leonard, author of Beatleness: How the Beatles and Their Fans Remade the World (Arcade, 2014), the song is an excellent example of the emerging hippie ethos of the 1960s.

Other versions
Dino, Desi & Billy released a version of the song on their 1966 album, Souvenir.
Bobby Vee released a version of the song on his 1966 album, Look at Me Girl.
Normie Rowe released a version of the song as a single in 1967 that reached #46 in Australia.
Gary Lewis & the Playboys released a version of the song on their 1968 album, Close Cover Before Playing.
Twinn Connexion released a version of the song as a B-side to their 1968 single "I Think I Know Him" and was featured on the album, Twinn Connexion.
Steve and Eydie released a version of the song on their 1970 album, Man and a Woman.
Sketch Show released a version of the song on their 2002 album, Audio Sponge.

References

1966 songs
1966 singles
1967 singles
The Cyrkle songs
Bobby Vee songs
Gary Lewis & the Playboys songs
Song recordings produced by John Simon (record producer)
Columbia Records singles
Songs written by Jerry Keller